North 24th Street is a two-way street that runs south–north in the North Omaha area of Omaha, Nebraska, United States. With the street beginning at Dodge Street, the historically significant section of the street runs from Cuming Street to Ames Avenue. A portion of North 24th near Lake Street is considered the "Main Street" of the Near North Side, and was historically referred to as "The Street of Dreams." The corridor is widely considered the heart of Omaha's African-American community.

History

North 24th Street first became prominent as a center of Jewish life in Omaha in the 1870s and '80s. During that period, Jewish settlers opened a variety of shops along the strip to serve other new immigrants to Omaha. Located immediately north of Downtown Omaha, North 24th Street was the location of dozens of businesses, including bakeries, clothiers, groceries, drug stores and laundries. There were also a number of synagogues, churches and mortuaries along the street. In the 1910s, author Tillie Olsen's father worked in a confectionery along North 24th Street. The 1913 Easter Sunday tornado devastated the North 24th Street corridor, causing a great deal of death and destruction along its route.

In the aftermath of the lynching of Will Brown in 1919, Omaha's African-American residents increasingly encountered redlining against investment in their neighborhood. In addition, race-restrictive covenants prevented their moving to other areas. Accompanied by earlier white residents moving to other areas as population increased, these economic and social restrictions led to the Near North Side becoming exclusively African American. North 24th Street and the neighborhood surrounding it became the nucleus of Omaha's most significant African-American neighborhood. During the 1920s, a number of African American-owned businesses and cultural establishments developed along the street as population increased and thrived. The Dreamland Ballroom, where events were held marking the beginning of the "black movement" in Omaha, smaller musical establishments, several movie theaters and new churches were all built up along the street. Business and culture along North 24th continued to thrive into the 1950s, as many African Americans made progress in gaining higher skilled industrial jobs and some went on to higher education.

July 4, 1966 marked the first of several riots along North 24th Street. After a 103 degree day, a crowd of African Americans gathered in the evening at the intersection of North 24th and Lake Streets, the heart of the Near North Side. When police demanded their dispersal, the crowd erupted, quickly demolishing police cars and destroying neighboring businesses. The crowd then roamed the North 24th Street business corridor for hours, firebombing vacant buildings and demolishing storefronts up and down the street. Millions of dollars in damage was caused to businesses. Events went on for several more days.

The business district along North 24th Street has not recovered since the riots; however, new investments by the City of Omaha have shown "promising returns" since 2000.

Neighborhoods

North 24th Street begins at Dodge Street in Downtown Omaha. Going from south to north, the street immediately travels underneath I-480 and through the Creighton University campus in the NoDo neighborhood. The Near North Side begins after crossing Cuming Street, with the intersection of North 24th and Lake Streets serving as the heart of North Omaha and the city's African American community. North 24th continues to Binney Street, which is the southern boundary of the Kountze Place neighborhood. The intersection of North 24th and Ames was once an important commercial district, along with the intersection with Fort Street, approximately two miles to the north. The area in between is the historic Saratoga neighborhood. After crossing the Storz Expressway the street travels through the Miller Park neighborhood and then the Minne Lusa neighborhood, ending at Read Street.

Revitalization
In 2006 the Greater Omaha Chamber of Commerce launched the North Omaha Development Project in order to secure strategic business, cultural and social investments in North Omaha. Planners seek to create a self-supporting private market and a neighborhood setting rewarding to its citizens and businesses. This is happening particularly in the wake of the recent redevelopment of the neighboring NoDo area of Downtown Omaha. The plan includes the continued expansion of Creighton University and the development of a "dual gateway" at 24th and Cuming, with the southern side of the intersection providing an ornamental entrance to Creighton, and the northern side becoming a "retail village" that opens up to North Omaha. Along North 24th to Parker Street there could be townhouses and other new housing developed. The area around North 24th and Lake Streets would emphasize arts, entertainment and culture. The plan takes advantage of Love's Jazz and Art Center and the Dreamland Plaza. A new theater and a financially viable African-American museum near the intersection could enhance it as the cultural center of north Omaha.

The City of Omaha is supporting this effort with the North 24th Street Historic Jazz District Project, focusing on the street between Ohio and Cuming Street. Funded by nearly $2 million in city and federal grants, the total estimated cost of the project is $3.5 million to $4.5 million.

Notable locations 

Several important Omaha Landmarks are located along North 24th Street. They include the Calvin Memorial Presbyterian Church, built in 1910 at 3105 North 24th Street; the Jewell Building, built in 1923 at 2221 North 24th Street; and the Redick Mansion, originally built in 1875, which became the first home of Omaha University in 1909. It was located at 3612 North 24th Street. The Paul Street School was built at 1311 North 24th Street in 1892; in 1952 it was replaced with Kellom Elementary School. The Omaha Star building at 2216 North 24th Street was a mortuary and social hall before becoming home to the historic Omaha Star. The notable Druid Hall is located at 2412 Ames Avenue just off North 24th Street. Further north is Pearl Memorial United Methodist Church, located at North 24th and Odgen Avenue, and further still is Miller Park.

The Fair Deal Cafe, once known as Omaha's "Black City Hall", is being revitalized, as is the city's first African American banking institution, Carver Savings and Loan Association. Both sit along North 24th. Love’s Jazz and Art Center, named in honor of North Omaha native Preston Love, is located at 2510 North 24th Street. The Native Omaha Club is located at 3819 North 24th Street. The Dr. Martin Luther King Jr. Cornerstone Memorial, installed in 2006, is located at the intersection of North 24th and Lake Streets. The Dreamland Plaza, installed in 2004, is a tribute to the Dreamland Ballroom and is located at North 24th and Erskine Streets. The bi-annual Native Omaha Days parade has been held along North 24th Street since the mid-1970s.

See also
History of North Omaha, Nebraska

References

External links
 "A History of North 24th Street" by Adam Fletcher Sasse for NorthOmahaHistory.com
Modern rendering of planned rejuvenation of North 24th and Cuming Streets
Historic postcard of the intersection of North 24th and Grant after the 1913 tornado
Historic postcard of the intersection of North 24th and Lake after the 1913 tornado
Historic postcard of the intersection of North 24th and Ohio after the 1913 tornado

African-American history in Omaha, Nebraska
Streets in Omaha, Nebraska
North Omaha, Nebraska